The 2017 Real Monarchs season is the club's third season of existence, and their third season in the United Soccer League.

Background 

Real Monarchs finished the 2016 season with 10 wins, six draws and 14 losses. They finished 11th in the Western Conference and failed to qualify for the playoffs. Ricardo Velazco lead the Monarchs will six goals during the season. Velazco signed an MLS contract with their parent club, Real Salt Lake ahead of the 2017 season.

Transfers

In 

|-
|}

Out 

|-
|}

From RSL Academy 

|}

Competitions

Preseason

USL

Table

Results

Statistics

See also 
2017 Real Salt Lake season

References

2017 USL season
2017
2017 in sports in Utah
American soccer clubs 2017 season